Shingu Charpa is a mountain in the Hushe Region in Pakistan. It is a 5800-meter Karakorum spire located in Masherbrum massif in Nangma valley.

Climbing history

Success

In July 2000 a three-person Korean Team succeeded in ascending to the summit of Shingu Charpa.

Recent Attempts

July 2006 Igor Chaplynsky, Andrey Rodiontsev and Orest Verbitsky (Ukrainian), attempted North Ridge route
August 2006 Kelly Cordes and Josh Wharton (American), attempted North Ridge route
September 2007 Alexander Klenov, Mikhail Davy and Alexander Shabunin (Ruassian), summited via East Face to intersecting North Ridge and named this route "Never More"

Routes

North Ridge

The spectacular North Ridge route follows Shingu Charpa's North pointing ridge that rises out of the Nangma Valley. The North Ridge route has been attempted at least twice but has not been successfully ascended to the summit of Shingu Charpa.

Never More

The route Never More ascends the east face of Shingu Charpa and intersects the North Ridge route near the summit.

Notes and references

Mountains of Gilgit-Baltistan
Five-thousanders of the Karakoram